No. 117 (Bomber Reconnaissance) Squadron was a Royal Canadian Air Force squadron that was active during the Second World War. It was originally formed as a fighter squadron and then a Coast Artillery Co-operation squadron before being disbanded in 1939, and then reformed in its final role in 1941, disbanded later that year, reformed in 1942 and then disbanded permanently in 1943. It was primarily based at Sydney, Nova Scotia and used in an anti-submarine role.

References

See also
 RCAF Eastern Air Command

Royal Canadian Air Force squadrons (disbanded)
Military units and formations of Canada in World War II